Gold Escorts were common across Australian goldfields, transporting mined and processed material from mines to banks and mints across the country.

They were important in safely transporting gold, and were in most cases carried out by police assisted units.

Victoria 
During the Victorian Gold Rush of the 1850s, a special armed detachment from South Australia provided a 'Gold Escort' for the secure transportation of gold overland from the western Victorian gold fields to Adelaide. The first gold escort led by Alexander Tolmer (a 'colourful' character who later became the South Australian Police Commissioner) departed Victoria on 5 March 1852 carrying  of gold and arrived in Adelaide two weeks later.  Eventually, eighteen trips were made between 1852 and 1853 transporting  of gold.  The Victorian-goldfields to Adelaide route was notable for the distance and amount of gold carried, almost a quarter of all gold, transported within Victoria during the gold rush (1851-1865). 

The Gold Escort route started in the Bendigo area and then went west across the Pyrenees to the small settlement of Horsham. From Horsham, the route passed north-west through the Little Desert region into South Australian territory and then ran roughly parallel with the coast to Adelaide.

References

Australian gold rushes
History of mining in Australia
Gold rush
History of Australia (1851–1900)
Victoria (Australia) gold rushes
1850s in Victoria (Australia)